Mohammad or Muhammmad Shahid may refer to:

 Mohammed Shahid (1960–2016), Indian hockey player
 Mohammad Shahid (Bangladeshi cricketer) (born 1988), Bangladeshi cricketer
 Mohammad Shahid (Indian cricketer) (1948–2014), Indian cricketer
 Mohammad Shahid (Pakistani cricketer) (born 2000), Pakistani cricketer
 Muhammad Shahid (footballer) (born 1985), Pakistani footballer
 Mohammad Shahid Jabbar, Indian footballer
 Muhammad Shahid Sarwar, Bangladeshi military personnel
 Mohammad Hameed Shahid (born 1957), Urdu fiction writer and literary critic